Yolanda Ramírez Ochoa (born 1 March 1935) is a Mexican tennis player active in the 1950s and 1960s. She was twice a singles finalist and once a women's doubles champion and mixed doubles champion at the French Open.

Career
Ramírez was a singles finalist at the French Championships in 1960 and 1961. She lost the 1960 final to Darlene Hard and the 1961 final to Ann Haydon. She also was a quarterfinalist at Wimbledon in 1959 and 1961, a quarterfinalist at the 1961 and 1963 U.S. Championships, a semifinalist at the 1962 Australian Championships, a semifinalist at the 1959 Italian Championships, and a finalist in Monte Carlo in 1959. Ochoa won the German Championships in 1957 and was a finalist in 1961.

Ramirez teamed with Rosie Reyes to win the women's doubles title at the 1958 French Championships and to reach the final at the 1957 and 1959 French Championships. She teamed with Billy Knight to win the mixed doubles title at the 1959 French Championships. With Edda Buding, she reached the women's doubles final at the 1961 U.S. Championships. She also won the women's doubles titles at the Italian Championships and in Monte Carlo, both in 1960.

At the tournament in Cincinnati, Ramirez won the singles title in 1956 and the doubles title (with Sara Mae Turber) in 1955. She was a doubles finalist in 1956.

In 1959 she won the South of France Championships in Nice, France.

Ramírez won the singles titles at the 1960 Mexico National Championships and the 1961 Caribbean Lawn Tennis Championship.

During her career, Ramírez had wins over Billie Jean King (in the second round of Wimbledon in 1961, which was King's first appearance at the tournament), Jones, and Christine Truman.

According to Lance Tingay of The Daily Telegraph and the Daily Mail, Ramírez was ranked in the world top 10 in 1957 and from 1959 through 1961, reaching a career high of world no. 6 in 1961.

She married Alfonso Ochoa on 29 August 1962.

Grand Slam finals

Singles (2 runners-up)

Doubles (1 title, 3 runners-up)

Mixed doubles (1 title)

Grand Slam singles tournament timeline

See also 
 Performance timelines for all female tennis players who reached at least one Grand Slam final

References

External links 
 
 
 

1935 births
Living people
Mexican female tennis players
Sportspeople from Puebla
Grand Slam (tennis) champions in women's doubles
Grand Slam (tennis) champions in mixed doubles
Pan American Games medalists in tennis
Pan American Games gold medalists for Mexico
Pan American Games silver medalists for Mexico
Pan American Games bronze medalists for Mexico
Tennis players at the 1955 Pan American Games
French Championships (tennis) champions
Central American and Caribbean Games medalists in tennis
Central American and Caribbean Games gold medalists for Mexico
Central American and Caribbean Games bronze medalists for Mexico
Medalists at the 1955 Pan American Games
Medalists at the 1959 Pan American Games
Medalists at the 1963 Pan American Games
20th-century Mexican women